The 9 July 2009 Tal Afar bombing was a double suicide bombing which occurred in Tal Afar, Iraq in July 2009. The bombing occurred when two men detonated explosive vests.

The attacks targeted the Governor of the Iraqi Central Bank. However, he was unhurt in the incident. Thirty four people were killed and more than 60 were injured.

See also
List of bombings during the Iraq War

References

2009 murders in Iraq
21st-century mass murder in Iraq
Mass murder in 2009
Suicide bombings in Iraq
Terrorist incidents in Iraq in 2009
July 2009 events in Asia